Sir Josias Cunningham, DL (20 January 1934 – 9 August 2000) was a Northern Irish stock broker, farmer and politician.

Early life
Josias Cunningham, known as "Joe", the grandson of Samuel Cunningham, was born into a family of stock brokers, the family firm being Cunningham Coates. The family also owned The Northern Whig newspaper. He was educated at Fettes College, Edinburgh, where his uncles James Glencairn Cunningham and Dunlop McCosh Cunningham had attended. He then went on to read biological sciences at Clare College, Cambridge, where his uncle and politician Knox Cunningham had also attended.

Career and politics
As well as working in the family firm he farmed  of County Antrim. In 1991, upon the death of Sir George Clarke, he was elected President of the Ulster Unionist Council and was one of the last remainders of Northern Ireland's moneyed families to remain involved in politics through "The Troubles". He was a member of the Orange Order and lived on his farm at Templepatrick, County Antrim. The Cunningham family still remain active in the Parkgate and Templepatrick area with his son and widow continuing to live on the family estate.

Death
Sir Josias Cunningham died in a car accident at Carryduff, County Down in 2000, aged 66. His funeral took place in 1st Donegore Presbyterian Church. He was married and had four children. The UUP headquarters, Cunningham House, was named in his family's honour, and was dedicated by his widow.

References

1934 births
2000 deaths
People from County Antrim
British stockbrokers
Deputy Lieutenants of Antrim
Knights Bachelor
Ulster Unionist Party politicians
Businesspeople from Northern Ireland
Presbyterians from Northern Ireland
People educated at Fettes College
Road incident deaths in Northern Ireland